Caputi is an Italian surname. Notable people with the surname include:

Adriano Baracchini Caputi (1883–1968), Italian painter
Luca Caputi (born 1988), Canadian ice hockey player and coach

See also
Caputo

Italian-language surnames